The 2009–10 Boston College Eagles women's basketball team will represent Boston College in the 2009–10 NCAA Division I women's basketball season. The team will be coached by Sylvia Crawley. The Eagles are a member of the Atlantic Coast Conference and will attempt to win an NCAA championship.

Offseason
 Aug. 20: Boston College center Carolyn Swords is one of 30 candidates named to the 2009-10 preseason Women's John R. Wooden Award.
 July 30: Carolyn Swords was named to the 2009-10 preseason "Wade Watch" list for the State Farm Wade Trophy Division I Player of the Year announced by the Women's Basketball Coaches Association (WBCA) .

Regular season

Roster

Schedule
The Eagles will compete in various tournaments. From November 27–28, the Eagles will participate in the SMU Tournament. On December 13, the Eagles will take part in the Maggie Dixon Classic. During the last week of December, the Eagles will take part in the San Diego Surf and Slam.

ACC tournament

Player stats

Postseason

NCAA tournament

Awards and honors

Team players drafted into the WNBA

See also
 2009–10 ACC women’s basketball season
 2009–10 NCAA Division I women's basketball season
 List of Atlantic Coast Conference women's basketball regular season champions
 List of Atlantic Coast Conference women's basketball tournament champions

References

External links
 Official Site

Boston College
Boston College Eagles women's basketball seasons
Boston College Eagles women's basketball
Boston College Eagles women's basketball
Boston College Eagles women's basketball
Boston College Eagles women's basketball